

Events

January–March 

January 1 – Nominal beginning of the Trienio Liberal in Spain: A constitutionalist military insurrection at Cádiz leads to the summoning of the Spanish Parliament (March 7).
January 8 – General Maritime Treaty ("General Treaty for the Cessation of Plunder and Piracy by Land and Sea, Dated February 5, 1820") signed between the sheikhs of Abu Dhabi, Sharjah, Ajman, Umm al-Quwain and Ras Al Khaimah (later constituents of the Trucial States) in the Arabian Peninsula and the United Kingdom.
January 27 (NS) – An Imperial Russian Navy expedition, led by Fabian Gottlieb von Bellingshausen in Vostok with Mikhail Petrovich Lazarev, sights the Antarctic ice sheet.
January 29 – George IV of the United Kingdom ascends the throne, on the death at Windsor Castle of his father George III (after 59 years on the throne), ending the 9-year period known as the British Regency. There will be a gap of 21 years before the title Prince of Wales is next used.
January 30 – British Royal Navy captain Edward Bransfield, an Irishman,  in the Williams is the first person to positively identify Antarctica as a land mass.
February 6
 Capture of Valdivia: Lord Cochrane occupies Valdivia in the name of the Republic of Chile.
 86 free African American colonists sail from New York City to Freetown, Sierra Leone.
February 14 – Minh Mạng starts to rule in Vietnam.
February 20 – A revolt begins in Santa María Chiquimula, Totonicapán Department of Guatemala.
February 23 – Cato Street Conspiracy: A plot to murder the Cabinet of the United Kingdom is exposed in England.
March 3 – A fire in Guangzhou (Canton) burns 15,000 houses and kills an undetermined number of people.
March 3 and 6 – Slavery in the United States: The Missouri Compromise becomes law, allowing admission of Missouri and Maine, slave and free states respectively, as U.S. states.
March 9 – King Ferdinand VII of Spain accepts the new constitution, beginning the Trienio Liberal.
March 10 – The Astronomical Society of London is founded.
March 15 – Maine is admitted as the 23rd U.S. state.
March 26 – Likely date when Joseph Smith, founder of the Latter Day Saint movement, receives his First Vision in Palmyra, New York (possibly March 26).
March 28 - A Coup d'état against Paraguayan dictator José Gaspar Rodríguez de Francia fails. Fulgencio Yegros and Pedro Juan Caballero are some of the people behind it.

April–June 
 April – Hans Christian Ørsted discovers the relationship between electricity and magnetism.
April 1 – A proclamation, signed "By order of the Committee of Organisation for forming a Provisional Government", begins the "Radical War" in Scotland.
April 8 – The statue of the Venus de Milo (Aphrodite of Milos, c.150 BC-125 BC) is discovered on the Greek island of Milos, by a peasant named Yorgos Kentrotas.
April 12 – Alexander Ypsilantis is declared leader of Filiki Eteria, a secret organization to overthrow Ottoman rule over Greece.
April 15 – King William I of Württemberg marries his cousin, Pauline Therese, in Stuttgart.
May 1
 The last judicial decapitation in the United Kingdom is meted out to the principals in the Cato Street conspirators after their public hanging for treason in London (legally, a mitigation of the last sentence in Britain of hanging, drawing and quartering).
 Robert Owen's Report to the County of Lanark, of a plan for relieving public distress and removing discontent (published 1821) is delivered in Scotland; he is beginning to devise the labour voucher.
May 11 –  (the ship that will later take young Charles Darwin on his scientific voyage) is launched at Woolwich Dockyard.
May 20 – 14-year-old John Stuart Mill sets out on his formative trip to the south of France, staying with Samuel Bentham.
June 5 – Caroline of Brunswick, the estranged wife of King George IV of the United Kingdom, returns to England after six years abroad in Italy, where she has been carrying on an affair; since ascending the throne in January, the King has sought to receive his government's approval for a divorce.
June 10 – Sir Thomas Munro is appointed as the British colonial Governor of the Madras Presidency, which encompasses most of southern India.
June 12 
 Élie Decazes, leader of the opposition in France's Chamber of Deputies, successfully introduces the "Law of the Double Vote", a proposal to add to the 258 existing legislators by creating 172 seats that would be "selected by special electoral colleges" made up of the wealthiest 25% of voters in each of France's departments.
 Delegates in St. Louis, Missouri Territory approve a proposed state constitution, proclaiming that they "do mutually agree to form and establish a free and independent republic, by the name of "The State of Missouri".<ref>"Missouri", in Constitutional Documents of the United States of America 1776-1860", ed. by Horst Dippel (K. G. Saur, 2007) p221</ref>
June 29 –  The cause of action that will lead to the U.S. Supreme Court case known simply as The Antelope arises, when a U.S. Treasury cutter captures a ship of the same name, which is transporting 281 Africans who had been captured as slaves, in violation of the 1808 U.S. law prohibiting the slave trade.

 July–September 
July 13 – A revolt under Guglielmo Pepe forces Ferdinand I of the Two Sicilies to sign a constitution modeled on the Spanish Constitution of 1812.
July 20 – Saint Cronan's Boys' National School opens in Bray, Co. Wicklow, Ireland under the title Bray Male School. It is the oldest school in Bray, and its notable pupils will include President of Ireland Cearbhall Ó Dálaigh.
July 26 – Union Chain Bridge, a wrought iron suspension bridge designed by Captain Samuel Brown, opens across the River Tweed, between England and Scotland. Its span of 449 ft (137 m) is the world's longest for a vehicular bridge at this time.
July 31 – A fire breaks out in the wine depot at the Bercy section of Paris.  It is reported later that "In the absence of water to supply the engines, an attempt was made to extinguish the flames with wine— of which a lake of 50 ft. square and more than a foot deep was formed; but the fire continued to rage, as well it might, being supplied by alcohol, and great destruction of property resulted.
August 1 — Completion and opening of the Regent's Canal through to the London Docks.
August 24 – A Constitutionalist insurrection breaks out at Oporto, Portugal.
September 2 – The Daoguang Emperor succeeds to the throne of Qing dynasty China.
September 5 – José Gervasio Artigas flees to Paraguay. 
September 15 – Revolution breaks out in Lisbon against John VI of Portugal.

 October–December 
October 9 – Guayaquil declares independence from Spain.
October 25–November 20 – The Congress of Troppau (Opava) is convened between the rulers of Russia, Austria and Prussia.
November 17 – American seal hunter Captain Nathaniel Palmer becomes the third person to see Antarctica. (The Palmer Peninsula is later named after him.)
November 20 – After the sinking of the American whaleship Essex of Nantucket, by a sperm whale in the southern Pacific Ocean, the survivors are left afloat in three small whaleboats. They eventually resort, by common consent, to cannibalism to allow some to survive.
December 3 – 1820 United States presidential election: James Monroe is re-elected, virtually unopposed.

 Date unknown 
 The Argentine Confederation (Argentina) formally claims the Falkland Islands, which are without permanent population at this time.
 Mount Rainier erupts over modern-day Seattle.
 18,957 black slaves leave Luanda, Angola.
 Construction work is completed on the Citadelle Laferrière in Haiti, the largest fortification in the Americas, built on the orders of Henri Christophe to defend the country against potential French reoccupation.
 Anchor coinage is first struck in silver in London denominated in fractions of the Mauritian dollar for use in British colonies.
 The 6th edition of the Encyclopædia Britannica'' is published in Scotland

Births

January–June 

January 10 – Louisa Lane Drew, actress, prominent theater manager, grandmother of the Barrymores (d. 1897)
January 17 – Anne Brontë, English author (d. 1849)
January 20 – Alexandre-Émile Béguyer de Chancourtois, French chemist and mineralogist (d. 1886)
January 30 – Concepción Arenal, Spanish feminist writer, activist  (d. 1893)
February 8 – William Tecumseh Sherman, American Civil War general (d. 1891)
February 13 – James Geiss, English businessman (d. 1878)
February 15
 Susan B. Anthony, American suffragist (d. 1906)
 Arvid Posse, 2nd Prime Minister of Sweden (d. 1901)
February 17 – Henri Vieuxtemps, Belgian violinist and composer (d. 1881)
February 28 – John Tenniel, English illustrator (d. 1914)
March 2 – Eduard Douwes Dekker, Dutch writer (d. 1887)
March 3 – Henry D. Cogswell, American temperance movement pioneer who endowed a number of Cogswell fountains  (d. 1900)
March 4 – Francesco Bentivegna, Italian revolutionary (d. 1856)
March 4 – Alexander Worthy Clerk, Jamaican Moravian teacher and missionary (d. 1906)
March 9 – Samuel Blatchford, Associate Justice of the Supreme Court of the United States (d. 1893)
March 14 – Victor Emmanuel II of Italy (d. 1878)
March 17 – Martin Jenkins Crawford, American politician (d. 1883)
March 20 – Alexandru Ioan Cuza, Romania's first reigning Domnitor (d. 1873)
April 27 – Herbert Spencer, English philosopher (d. 1903)
April 26 – Alice Cary, American poet, sister to Phoebe Cary (1824-1871) (d. 1871)
May 5 – Elkanah Billings, Canadian paleontologist (d. 1876)
May 12 – Florence Nightingale, English nurse (d. 1910)
May 23 – Lorenzo Sawyer, 9th Chief Justice of the Supreme Court of California (d. 1891)
May 25 – François Claude du Barail, French general and Minister of War (d. 1902)
May 27 – Mathilde Bonaparte, Italian princess (d. 1904)

July–December 

July 5 – William John Macquorn Rankine, Scottish physicist, engineer (d. 1872)
July 22 – Oliver Mowat, Canadian lawyer, politician (d. 1903)
July 23 – Julia Gardiner Tyler, First Lady of the United States (d. 1889)
July 25 – Henry Doulton, English potter (d. 1897)
September 17
 Émile Augier, French dramatist (d. 1889)
 Earl van Dorn, American Confederate general (d. 1863)
September 20 – John F. Reynolds, American general (d. 1863)
September 27 – Wilhelm Siegmund Teuffel, German classical scholar (d. 1878)
September 29 – Henri, Count of Chambord, claimant to the French throne (d. 1883)
October 5 – David Wilber, American politician (d. 1890)
October 6 – Jenny Lind, Swedish soprano (d. 1887)
October 16 – Gillis Bildt, 5th Prime Minister of Sweden (d. 1894)
October 20 – Benjamin F. Cheatham, American Confederate general (d. 1886)
November 23
 Isaac Todhunter, English mathematician (d. 1884)
 Ludwig von Hagn, German painter (d. 1898)
November 28 – Friedrich Engels, German social philosopher (d. 1895)
December 21 – William H. Osborn, American railroad executive (d. 1894)

Date unknown
 Song Qing, Chinese general (d. 1902)

Deaths

January–June 

January 17 – Daniel Albert Wyttenbach, Swiss-born academic (b. 1746)
January 29 – King George III of the United Kingdom (b. 1738)
February 5 – William Drennan, Irish physician, poet and radical politician (b. 1754)
February 11 – Karl von Fischer, German architect (b. 1782)
February 14 – Charles Ferdinand, Duke of Berry, French noble (stabbed) (b. 1778)
March 11 – Benjamin West, Anglo-American painter of historical scenes (b. 1738)
March 22 – Stephen Decatur, American sailor (b. 1779)
April 8 – Thomas Douglas, 5th Earl of Selkirk, Scottish-born philanthropist (b. 1771)
April 20 – James Morris III, Continental Army officer from Connecticut (b. 1752)
May 30 – William Bradley, Britain's tallest ever man (b. 1787)
June 6 – Henry Grattan, Irish politician (b. 1746)
June 9 – Wilhelmina of Prussia, Princess of Orange (b. 1751)
June 19 – Sir Joseph Banks, English naturalist and botanist (b. 1743)
June 20 – Manuel Belgrano, Argentine politician, general in the Independence War (b. 1770)

July–December 

August 6 – Antonín Vranický, Bohemian violinist and composer (b. 1761)
August 9 – Anders Sparrman, Swedish naturalist (b. 1748)
August 12 – Manuel Lisa, Spanish-born American fur trader (b. 1772)
September 2 – Jiaqing Emperor, Chinese emperor (b. 1760)
September 3 – Benjamin Latrobe, Anglo-American architect (b. 1764)
September 4 – Timothy Brown, English banker, merchant and radical (b. 1743/1744)
September 16 – Nguyễn Du, Vietnamese poet (b. 1766)
September 18 – Mariana Joaquina Pereira Coutinho, Portuguese courtier, salonnière (b. 1748)
September 26 – Daniel Boone, American pioneer (b. 1734)
September 28 – Pedro Andrés del Alcázar, Spanish and later Chilean Army officer and war hero (b. 1752)
September 29 – Barthelemy Lafon, Creole architect and smuggler (b. 1769)
October 8 – Henri Christophe, Haitian revolutionary leader (suicide) (b. 1767)
October 11 – James Keir, Scottish geologist, chemist and industrialist (b. 1735)
October 15 – Karl Philipp Fürst zu Schwarzenberg, Austrian field marshal (b. 1771)
November 1 – Pierre Martin, French admiral (b. 1752)
November 8 – Lavinia Stoddard, American poet and school founder (b. 1787)
December 25 – Joseph Fouché, French statesman (b. 1759)
December 29 – Princess Pauline of Anhalt-Bernburg, German regent and social reformer (b. 1769)

References 

 
Leap years in the Gregorian calendar